Robert Lee Patten II (November 21, 1925 – May 15, 1994) was an American politician. He was a member of the Georgia House of Representatives, first elected in 1972. He was a member of the Democratic party.

References

1994 deaths
Democratic Party members of the Georgia House of Representatives
1925 births
People from Lanier County, Georgia
20th-century American politicians